Darren Walker (born 8 June 1966) is an Australian former cricketer. He played one first-class cricket match for Victoria in 1988.

See also
 List of Victoria first-class cricketers

References

External links
 

1966 births
Living people
Australian cricketers
Victoria cricketers
Sportspeople from Bendigo